P'isaqayuq (Quechua p'isaqa Nothoprocta -yuq a suffix, "the one with Nothoprocta", also spelled Pisacayo) is a mountain in the Bolivian Andes which reaches a height of approximately . It is located in the Chuquisaca Department, Jaime Zudáñez Province, Icla Municipality.

References 

Mountains of Chuquisaca Department